The 1984–85 Greek Football Cup was the 43rd edition of the Greek Football Cup.

Tournament details

Totally 76 teams participated, 16 from Alpha Ethniki, 20 from Beta, and 40 from Gamma. It was held in 7 rounds, included final. An Additional Round was held between First and Second, with 6 matches, in order that the teams would continue to be 32.

It was the first Greek Cup Final since 1980, where the two finalists were clubs not based on Attica, AEL and PAOK. The two teams had lost in the four previous Finals. PAOK had eliminated two fellow-citizens, Iraklis and Aris, in the two first rounds, and cup holders Panathinaikos in the semi-finals with an impressive second-leg 4-0 home victory(4-2 on aggregate). Larissa had eliminated only one Alpha Ethniki team, Apollon Kalamarias, in the Additional Round. However, they had won with big scores their opponents from lowest divisions: Panegialios with 8–0, Neapoli Piraeus with 7–0, Korinthos with 6–1 and Levadiakos with 5–0.

From the interests of year were the qualification of Panathinaikos against Olympiacos, in the Third Round, with two wins in the Olympic Stadium, the common home of both teams. Also, the elimination of AEK Athens for first time from a Gamma Ethniki team, Lamia, that afterwards was crushed, accepting in total 15 goals from PAOK in the Third Round. Also, in the First Round, Olympiacos Volos eliminated Acharnaikos in penalty shootout 1–0, after a "white draw". By 9 shoots, there was only one well-aimed. OFI were eliminated in the First Round by Odysseas Kordelio.

In the Final, Larissa gained their first title in their history, winning PAOK 4–1. Simultaneously, they deprived The Double by PAOK, that won the championship of that year. It is remarkable that PAOK's coach, Austrian Walter Skotzik, was the coach of Larissa in previous season, when they lost in the Final by Panathinaikos. An interesting story of the final was that PAOK’s top goalscorer of that season Christos Dimopoulos didn’t participate as he left the team at Athens‘ airport when they arrived from Thessaloniki for the game. Dimopoulos headed to the headquarters of Motor Oil (company of Panathinaikos‘ president Vardinoyannis) in order to seal his transfer to Panathinaikos as his 5-year contract with PAOK was expiring.

Calendar

Knockout phase
Each tie in the knockout phase, apart from the first two rounds and the final, was played over two legs, with each team playing one leg at home. The team that scored more goals on aggregate over the two legs advanced to the next round. If the aggregate score was level, the away goals rule was applied, i.e. the team that scored more goals away from home over the two legs advanced. If away goals were also equal, then extra time was played. The away goals rule was again applied after extra time, i.e. if there were goals scored during extra time and the aggregate score was still level, the visiting team advanced by virtue of more away goals scored. If no goals were scored during extra time, the winners were decided by a penalty shoot-out. In the first two rounds and the final, which were played as a single match, if the score was level at the end of normal time, extra time was played, followed by a penalty shoot-out if the score was still level.The mechanism of the draws for each round is as follows:
There are no seedings, and teams from the same group can be drawn against each other.

First round

|}

Additional round

|}

Bracket

Round of 32

|}

Round of 16

|}

Quarter-finals

|}

Semi-finals

|}

Final

The 41st Greek Cup Final was played at the Olympic Stadium.

References

External links
Greek Cup 1984-85 at RSSSF

Greek Football Cup seasons
Greek Cup
Cup